The 1981 FIVB Women's World Cup was held from 6 to 16 November 1981 in Osaka, Japan.

Teams

Results

|}

|}

Final standing

Awards

 Most Valuable Player
  Sun Jinfang
 Best Attacker
  Flo Hyman
 Best Blocker
  Yelena Akhaminova
 Best Setter
  Sun Jinfang

 Best Server
  Rieko Mizuhara
 Best Defender
  Miyoko Hirose
 Best Coach
  Yuan Weimin
 Spirit of Fight
  Mercedez Pérez

External links
 Results

1981 Women
Women's World Cup
2
2
November 1981 sports events in Asia
Sports competitions in Osaka
Women's volleyball in Japan
20th century in Osaka